The Bad Dog Theatre Company is an improvisational theatre company based in Toronto, Ontario, Canada, and established in 2003. The theatre is eclectic and broad in its production of shows, with a focus on short-form improv, but it has branched out to include the work of other schools of thought in improvisation.

While short form improvisation is still a mainstay as in the weekly Theatresports shows, the theatre has embraced long form improv with the weekly Harold Night at the Bad Dog, musical improv in the form of Show Stopping Number: The Improvised Musical and 'Troubadour' plus innovated parody shows in Toronto starting with Hairy Patter and the Improviser's Stone and including The Lord of the Things, A Twisted Christmas Carol and Dreadwood. 

Several of the theatre's productions and co-productions have been nominated for Canadian Comedy Awards, and the theatre at 138 Danforth Avenue in Toronto has been twice-named 'Best Improv Theatre' in Toronto by NOW Magazine's annual 'Best of Toronto' awards.

History
The Bad Dog Theatre Company was founded in 2003, but can trace its roots back to 1982 when it was known as Theatresports Toronto. The company's work was based around that of director and playwright, Keith Johnstone. The company performed weekly improvisational comedy shows at 
Harbourfront in the Theatresports format. The show consisted of teams of improvisers competing with one another. Notable teams included Dangerous Poultry, The Parts, The Chumps and The Kids in the Hall. Some of these groups went on to greater fame.

Alumni from this period include Mike Myers, Tim Sims, Bruce Hunter (Puppets Who Kill), Pat McKenna (Red Green), Gary Campbell, (MadTV producer/screenwriter) Lisa Merchant (Train 48), Sandra Shamas (Playwright), Linda Kash (A Mighty Wind), Colin Mochrie (Whose Line Is It, Anyway) Globe and Mail Columnist Andrew Coyne and actor Keanu Reeves. It was through their work with Theatresports as well as legendary live shows at The Rivoli that Lorne Michaels reputedly came down to recruit Bruce McCulloch and Mark McKinney of the Kids in the Hall to write for Saturday Night Live.

In the early 1990s Theatresports left Harbourfront, performing at a series of venues, including St. Paul's Church basement, Big City Improv, Solar Stage and Tim Sims Playhouse, becoming Toronto's longest continually running improv comedy show. Nevertheless, audiences and workshop attendance had dwindled from the levels seen at Harbourfront.

In 2003, Theatresports Toronto established a permanent home at 138 Danforth Avenue. A push to 'reinvent' the organization led by Co-Artistic Directors Kerry Griffin and Marcel St. Pierre and Workshop Director Ralph MacLeod (producer of the successful student performance showcase That Friday Show) led to Theatresports Toronto becoming The Bad Dog Theatre Company on May 1, 2003.

The Bad Dog Theatre Company, whose current artistic and managing director is Alia Ceniza Rasul, offers classes at their education space on 392 Spadina Ave. and programs comedy shows in various theatres in Toronto.

Notes

References

External links
 Bad Dog Theatre website

Improvisational theatre in Canada
Theatre companies in Toronto
Performing groups established in 2003
2003 establishments in Ontario

 Now Magazine Review